Hangchuon Naron (born 2 January 1962) is a Cambodian academic, economist, and politician who is the current Minister for Education, Youth and Sport, serving since 2013. A member of the Cambodian People's Party, he was Secretary of State of Economy and Finance from 2004 to 2013.

Since taking office, he has implemented major educational reforms in Cambodia, which include anti-cheating exams.

Academic background 

 2018: Doctor of Philosophy in Educational Administration, Chulalongkorn University 
 2012: Diploma, Rhodes Academy of Oceans Law and Policy
 2010–12: Master of Laws, joint degree program of Royal University of Law and Economics and Lumière University Lyon 2
 2006-08: Associate, Chartered Insurance Institute; Associate, Malaysian Insurance Institute; Degree in Insurance, Chartered Insurance Institute
 1988–91: Doctor of Philosophy in International Economics, MGIMO 
 1982–85: Student at School of International Relations and International Law, Kiev State University
 1981–82: Preparatory courses, Institute of Technology of Cambodia
 1980–81: Baccalauréate II, Lycée Sisowath

Political offices 
 
 2018: Member of the National Assembly, Kampong Cham constituency 
 2013–present: Minister of Education, Youth and Sport of Cambodia
 2004–2013: Secretary of State, Ministry of Economy and Finance of Cambodia
 2004–2010: Secretary-General of the Ministry of Economy and Finance of Cambodia

References

External links

|-

1962 births
21st-century Cambodian politicians 
Living people
Education ministers 
Government ministers of Cambodia
Members of the National Assembly (Cambodia)
Cambodian People's Party politicians
Cambodian academics
Cambodian Theravada Buddhists
People from Phnom Penh
Royal University of Law and Economics alumni
Moscow State Institute of International Relations alumni
Hangchuon Naron